The Lift Boy is an Indian family-drama film that was released in 2019. It was written and directed by debutant Jonathan Augustin and produced by Caroline Pictures. Moin Khan and Nyla Masood appeared in leading roles in the film. The music is by Ryan Clark and edited by Parikshhit Jha.

Plot 
The film is about the life of 24-year-old Raju Tawde (Moin Khan). Raju’s father who is a lift operator in a building suffers heart attack while on duty. To fill his father’s shoes while he is away, Raju takes up the job. While working he befriends Mrs. D’Souza, the owner of the building. Throughout the course, Mrs. D’Souza helps Raju to clear a pending exam for engineering drawing.

Cast 
 Moin Khan as Raju Tawade - The Lift Boy
 Nyla Masood as Maureen D'Souza
 Saagar Kale as Krishna Tawade
 Aneesha Shah as Princess Kapoor
 Damian D'Souza as Shawn Lobo
 Neha Bam as Laxmi Tawade
 Nil Mani as Watchman
 Kaustubh Narain as Cyrus Mistry
 Shilpa Iyer as Mrs. Kapoor
 Santosh Mohite as Mama
 Pallas Prajapati as Boman Mistry
 Jigna Khajuria as Lata

Release and reception 
The film was released on 18 January 2019.

Firstpost gave it 2 out of 5 stars and stated: "An optimistic coming-of-age story marred by incomplete writing". Sify called it "simple yet heart warming" and gave it 2.5 out of 5 stars. TheWeek gave a positive review, saying it "lifts your heart", and gave it 3.5 out of 5 stars.

References

External links 
 

2019 films
English-language Indian films